Ida Reteno Assonouet was the Minister of Justice for Gabon from 2011 to 2013.

References

Gabonese politicians
Living people
Gabonese women in politics
Year of birth missing (living people)
21st-century Gabonese people